Oscar De La Hoya vs. Félix Trinidad, billed as The Fight of the Millennium, was a boxing match held at the Mandalay Bay Events Center on the Las Vegas Strip on September 18, 1999, to unify the WBC and IBF welterweight championships.

After twelve tensely fought rounds, Trinidad was declared the winner by a majority decision.

Planned by promoters Bob Arum and Don King, it pitted WBC world champion Oscar De La Hoya, a Mexican American, Los Angeles native, versus Puerto Rican IBF world champion Félix Trinidad. It was the last of the so-called superfights of the 20th century. 

The bout set the pay-per-view record for a non-heavyweight fight with 1.4 million buys on HBO, until it was broken by De La Hoya-Mayweather on May 5, 2007. It set the record 2.4 million buys, the most in boxing history until that was surpassed by Mayweather-Pacquiao in 2015 with the record of 4.4 million buys.

See also
Errol Spence Jr. versus Shawn Porter

References

Trinidad
1999 in boxing
Boxing in Las Vegas
1999 in sports in Nevada
September 1999 sports events in the United States
 Pay-per-view boxing matches
Nicknamed sporting events
Boxing on HBO